The 1997 MLS Expansion Draft was held November 6, 1997. Two teams participated, the Chicago Fire and Miami Fusion F.C., both expansion Major League Soccer clubs starting play in the 1998 season.

Format
Each team in the league made ten players, including at least one foreign player, available for the Fire and Fusion to select.  From this pool of available players, the two teams then selected twelve players.  Although Paul Caligiuri of the Los Angeles Galaxy was listed as exposed, he had recently won a lawsuit against the league which forced the league to place him with the Galaxy as his original contract with the league had stipulated.  Consequently, he was not available for selection.  The Fire won the first selection through a coin toss.  The draft was held via conference call.

Expansion Draft

Team-by Team breakdown

Colorado Rapids

Withdrew Sean Henderson upon selection of Matt Kmosko(18)
Withdrew Paul Grafer upon selection of Brian Bates (19)
Reached maximum upon selection of Steve Patterson (23)

Columbus Crew

Withdrew Billy Thompson upon selection of Jason Farrell(7)
Withdrew Mike Clark upon selection of Jorge Salcedo (9)
Reached maximum upon selection of A.J. Wood (21)

D.C. United

Withdrew Scott Garlick upon selection of David Vaudreuil (2)
Withdrew Roy Wegerle upon selection of John Maessner (4)
Reached maximum upon selection of Kris Kelderman (6)

Dallas Burn

Withdrew Eric Dade upon selection of Joey Martinez (8)
Withdrew Temoc Suarez upon selection of Jeff Cassar (10)
Reached maximum upon selection of Wade Webber (22)

Kansas City Wizards

Withdrew Brian Johnson upon selection of Diego Gutierrez (15)

Los Angeles Galaxy

Withdrew Harut Karapetyan upon selection of Danny Pena (1)
Withdrew Steve Jolley upon selection of Kevin Hartman (3)
Reached maximum upon selection of Bryan Taylor (24)

MetroStars

Withdrew Brian Bliss upon selection of Manny Lagos (5)
Withdrew Jeff Zaun upon selection of Zach Thornton (11)
Reached maximum upon selection of Andrew Lewis (17)

New England Revolution

Withdrew Steve Klein upon selection of Francis Okaroh (13)

San Jose Clash

Withdrew Shawn Medved upon selection of Ramiro Corrales (16)

Tampa Bay Mutiny

Withdrew Alan Prampin upon selection of Nelson Vargas (12)
Withdrew Sam George upon selection of Cle Kooiman (14)
Reached maximum upon selection of Scott Budnick (20)

References

Major League Soccer Expansion Draft
November 1997 sports events in the United States